Oleksandr Mykolayovych Kobelya (born 28 February 2002) is a Ukrainian professional footballer who plays as an attacking midfielder for Ukrainian club Nyva Ternopil.

References

External links
 
 

2002 births
Living people
Ukrainian footballers
Association football midfielders
FC Ternopil players
FC Nyva Ternopil players
Ukrainian First League players
Ukrainian Amateur Football Championship players
Sportspeople from Ternopil Oblast